Yujiulü Kangti (r. 553) was the penultimate khagan of the remnants of Rouran.

Life 
He was elder son of Yujiulü Dengzhu. He fled to Northern Qi following demise of Yujiulü Anagui in 552 with his father Dengzhu and Anluochen. He was raised to throne by a noble called Afuti (阿富提). However he didn't stand Tujue attacks either and fled back to Northern Qi. He was replaced by Anluochen on the orders of Emperor Wenxuan of Northern Qi.

References 

Khagans of the Rouran
Dethroned monarchs